Sir John Willes (c. 1721 – 24 November 1784) was an English politician. 

He was the eldest son of John Willes, Chief Justice of the Common Pleas, and his wife Margaret Brewster. Edward Willes, judge of the Court of King's Bench, was his younger brother. He was educated at Worcester College, Oxford (1738) and studied law at Lincoln's Inn (1734). He succeeded his father to Astrop Park near Banbury in 1761.

He was Member of Parliament (MP) for Banbury 1746–1754, and for Aylesbury 1754–1761. 

He died in 1784. In 1754 he had married Frances, the daughter and heiress of Thomas Freke, a Bristol merchant. They had one son and three daughters.

References 

1721 births
1784 deaths
Alumni of Worcester College, Oxford
Members of Lincoln's Inn
Members of the Parliament of Great Britain for English constituencies
British MPs 1741–1747
British MPs 1747–1754
British MPs 1754–1761